X My Heart is the 22nd studio album by Peter Hammill, originally released on Hammill's own Fie! Records in 1996.  It is the last of Hammill's albums to date performed in what might be described as a full band style; the later albums have been more solo and intimate in style.

Two of the songs on the album, "A Better Time" and "Amnesiac", have been performed live regularly by Hammill since the album was released.

Track listing
All songs written by Peter Hammill.
"A Better Time (Acapella)" – 5:14
"Amnesiac" – 5:36
"Ram Origami" – 5:28
"A Forest of Pronouns" – 5:18
"Earthbound" – 5:23
"Narcissus (Bar & Grill)" – 6:45
"Material Possession" – 6:09
"Come Clean" – 5:02
"A Better Time" – 5:33

Personnel 
Peter Hammill – vocals, guitar, keyboards, bass
David Jackson – saxophone, flute
Stuart Gordon – violin, viola, string arrangement
Manny Elias – drums, percussion

Technical
Peter Hammill - recording engineer, mixing (Terra Incognita, Bath)
Paul Ridout - cover

References

External links 
Peter Hammill's notes on the album

Peter Hammill albums
1996 albums